Korea University Station is a subway station on the Seoul Subway Line 6. This station is located in front of the main entrance of Korea University.

City of Seoul has a plan to develop campus town in front of main entrance of Korea University. Furthermore, new commercial districts will be constructed between Korea University Station and Anam Station. This district is expected to be a fresh and active campus town.

Station layout

References 

Seoul Metropolitan Subway stations
Metro stations in Seongbuk District
Railway stations opened in 2000
Korea University
Railway stations at university and college campuses